Doug Peterson (born April 4, 1959) is an American lawyer and politician who was the 33rd attorney general of Nebraska. A Republican, Peterson was elected attorney general during the 2014 election and assumed office in January 2015.

Biography
Peterson, who was born in Columbus, Nebraska, was raised in Lincoln, Nebraska. He graduated from the University of Nebraska in 1981 and earned a Juris Doctor from the Pepperdine University School of Law in 1985. Peterson worked for the district attorney of Lincoln County for two years until serving an additional two years as an assistant Nebraska attorney general to Robert Spire from 1988 until 1990. He entered private practice, where he would remain until his 2014 election as Attorney General of Nebraska.

Peterson was sworn in as the 32nd attorney general of Nebraska at the Nebraska State Capitol in Lincoln on January 8, 2015.

Peterson, who lives in Lincoln, is the nephew of former governor of Nebraska Val Peterson.

Tenure
In July 2017, Texas attorney general Ken Paxton led a group of Republican attorneys general from nine other states, including Peterson, plus Idaho governor Butch Otter, in threatening the Donald Trump administration that they would litigate if the president did not terminate the Deferred Action for Childhood Arrivals (DACA) policy that had been put into place by president Barack Obama. Tennessee attorney general Herbert H. Slatery, III subsequently reversed his position and withdrew his participation from the proposed suit on August 31. Slatery went further to urge passage of the DREAM Act. The other attorneys general who joined in making the threats against Trump included Leslie Rutledge of Arkansas, Lawrence Wasden of Idaho, Derek Schmidt of Kansas, Jeff Landry of Louisiana, Alan Wilson of South Carolina, and Patrick Morrisey of West Virginia.

Electoral history

References

|-

1959 births
21st-century American politicians
Living people
Nebraska Attorneys General
Nebraska lawyers
Nebraska Republicans
People from Columbus, Nebraska
Politicians from Lincoln, Nebraska
Pepperdine University alumni
University of Nebraska–Lincoln alumni